The 1922 All-Pacific Coast football team consists of American football players chosen by various organizations for All-Pacific Coast teams for the 1922 college football season.

All-Pacific Coast selections

Quarterback
 Charles F. Erb, California (UP-1; GV-1)

Halfbacks
 Donald Nichols, California (UP-1; GV-1)
 Leonard Ziel, Washington (UP-1; GV-1)
 George King, Oregon (GB-1)

Fullback
 Jesse B. Morrison, California (UP-1; GV-1)

Ends
 Robert A. Berkey, California (UP-1; GV-1)
 Harold Muller, California (UP-1; GV-1) (College Football Hall of Fame)

Tackles
 Stewart A. Beam, California (UP-1; GV-1)
 Ford Dunton, Washington State (UP-1)
 Percy Locey, Oregon Agricultural College (GV-1)

Guards
 Webster V. Clark, California (UP-1; GV-1)
 Leo Calland, USC (UP-1)
 Archie "Tiny" Shields, Oregon (GV-1)

Centers
 Dudley DeGroot, Stanford (UP-1; GV-1)
 Prink Callison, Oregon (GB-1)

Key

UP = United Press, "selected by the sporting editors or football writers of nine leading Pacific coast newspapers at the request of the United Press"

GV = George Varnell, "Pacific Coast and Northern Conference referee and local sporting writer"

GB = George Bertz, sporting editor of the Oregon Journal, Portland

See also
1922 College Football All-America Team

References

All-Pacific Coast Football Team
All-Pacific Coast football teams
All-Pac-12 Conference football teams